Wild rosemary is a common name for several plants and may refer to:

Wild growing forms of the cultivated rosemary
Andromeda polifolia (Bog rosemary) is known as wild rosemary, found in North America and  Eurasia
Wild relatives of cultivated rosemary in the genus Rosmarinus
Eriocephalus africanus and some other species of Eriocephalus are called wild rosemary (Afrikaans "wilde roosmaryn") in South Africa
Olearia axillaris is known as wild rosemary  in parts of Australia
Rhododendron tomentosum is called wild rosemary in parts of North America